John Beradino (born Giovanni Berardino, May 1, 1917 – May 19, 1996) was an American infielder in Major League Baseball and an actor. Known as Johnny Berardino during his baseball career, he was also credited during his acting career as John Berardino, John Baradino, John Barardino or John Barradino.

Early life and education

Beradino was born in Los Angeles. He grew up near Hollywood. Beradino attended Belmont High School, located in downtown Los Angeles. Beradino won a football scholarship to the University of Southern California in 1936. He soon switched to baseball.

Beradino is often mentioned as having appeared in the silent Our Gang comedies produced by Hal Roach as a child actor but has not been identified as having appeared in any of the existing films.

Career

Baseball
After attending the University of Southern California, where he played baseball under coach Sam Barry and was member of Phi Kappa Tau fraternity, Beradino was a major league player from 1939 to 1952, except for three years of military service in the U.S. Naval Reserve during World War II, from 1942 to 1945. He played for the St. Louis Browns, Cleveland Indians, and Pittsburgh Pirates, winning the World Series with the Indians in 1948. While primarily a middle-infielder, playing second baseman or shortstop, he also played first and third base. 

After injuring his leg and being released by Pittsburgh in 1952, he retired from baseball and returned to acting, having appeared in his first film in 1948.

Acting
Beradino appeared briefly in an uncredited role as a state trooper in the 1954 thriller Suddenly, starring Frank Sinatra and Sterling Hayden, and later performed as a policeman who allows Roger Thornhill (Cary Grant) to make a phone call to his mother in the 1959 Hitchcock thriller, North by Northwest.

Beradino had a cameo role in the 1954 sci-fi thriller Them!. He also had a guest role in a 1956 episode of the television series, Adventures of Superman titled "The Unlucky Number". He played a small-time criminal who struggled with his life-style and wanted to reform. At that point he was still being billed as "John Berardino".

Beradino appeared twice on the Western series Annie Oakley, with Gail Davis—as Gorman in "Annie Rides the Navajo Trail" and as Roscoe Barnes in "Amateur Outlaw" (both 1956). He appeared as one of the outlaws in the opening scenes of Budd Boetticher's "Seven Men From Now," with Randolph Scott, in 1956. He guest starred as well on John Bromfield's syndicated crime drama with a modern Western setting, Sheriff of Cochise, and Bromfield's successor series, U.S. Marshal. He was also cast in an episode of David Janssen's crime drama series Richard Diamond, Private Detective.

Beradino played a minor gangster in The Untouchables pilot that originally aired in Westinghouse Desilu Playhouse. He then played a major recurring gangster, Augie Viale, in two episodes from the first season of The Untouchables series itself, "The Jake Lingle Killing" and "One Armed Bandits".

On December 2, 1959, Beradino was cast as Al, a professional baseball player, in the episode, "The Third Strike" of the syndicated adventure series, Rescue 8, starring Jim Davis and Lang Jeffries. In the story line, the player loses consciousness when struck by a wild pitch and soon awakes with short-term amnesia.

After appearing in more than a dozen B-movies, as well as supporting roles, as FBI agent Steve Daniels in the espionage series I Led Three Lives and as LAPD Sergeant Vince Cavelli in Leslie Nielsen's The New Breed, he was offered the role of Dr. Steve Hardy on the soap opera General Hospital. Beradino also played a version of his General Hospital character on an episode of The Fresh Prince of Bel-Air.

Recognition
For his contribution to the television industry, Beradino has a star on the Hollywood Walk of Fame at 6801 Hollywood Blvd.  He has also been inducted into the University of Southern California Athletic Hall of Fame.

He is the only person to have won a World Series (1948) and have his star on the Hollywood Walk of Fame (1993).

Beradino received three Daytime Emmy Award nominations for best actor in a daytime drama.

In tribute to the actor, General Hospital left Beradino's image with that of Rachel Ames in its opening sequence for a year-and-a-half after his death, through several updates. Though that image was finally removed in early 1998 (leaving Ames with a new solo image), an "action" clip of Beradino's Steve Hardy in the hospital remained in the sequence until the sequence's 2004 retirement.

Personal life and death

Beradino married Jeanette Nadine Barritt in 1941 and divorced in 1955. Together they had two children: Toni and Cindy. He married Charissa Hughes (née Veronica Contos Patton) on January 20, 1961. Veronica or, “Ronnie,” died on June 14, 1963. Together they had two children: Katherine Ann and John Anthony. He married Marjorie Binder in 1971. He played Hardy from General Hospital inception in 1963 until becoming ill from pancreatic cancer in 1996. Beradino died on Sunday, May 19, 1996 in Los Angeles in his home.

Beradino supported Barry Goldwater in the 1964 United States presidential election.

Filmography

Film

Television

References

Sources

External links

The Virtual Card Collection – Johnny Berardino, 1952 Topps Card # 252
John Berardino at The Deadball Era

1917 births
1996 deaths
American male film actors
American male soap opera actors
Baseball players from Los Angeles
Belmont High School (Los Angeles) alumni
Burials at Holy Cross Cemetery, Culver City
Deaths from cancer in California
Deaths from pancreatic cancer
Cleveland Indians players
Major League Baseball second basemen
Military personnel from California
Pittsburgh Pirates players
St. Louis Browns players
United States Navy reservists
University of Southern California alumni
USC Trojans baseball players
20th-century American male actors
United States Navy personnel of World War II